The Twins–White Sox rivalry is a Major League Baseball (MLB) rivalry between the Minnesota Twins and the Chicago White Sox. Both clubs are members of MLB's American League (AL) Central division. Both teams were founding members of the AL; they have played each other annually since 1901 when the Twins played as the Washington Senators and the White Sox played as the White Stockings.  However, the rivalry did not begin in earnest until the 2000s, when the White Sox and Twins consistently battled for the AL Central crown.  The White Sox lead the overall series, 1,179–1,104.  The teams have never played each other in the Major League Baseball postseason.

The most prominent meeting between the two teams occurred in the 2008 American League Central tie-breaker game, which was necessitated by the two clubs finishing the season with identical records.  The White Sox won this game 1–0 on a Jim Thome home run.

History

1960s–1990s 
While the series dates back to 1901, the teams became regional rivals after the then-Washington Senators moved to Minnesota and became the Twins in 1961.  The  season saw the Twins and White Sox finish first and second in the American League Standings, with the Twins winning the pennant by seven games. Both teams were placed in the AL West following the  realignment, but inconsistent play from both teams throughout the 1970s and 1980s prevented a rivalry from developing.

In , both teams were placed in the newly formed AL Central but both teams declined throughout the remainder of the decade.

2000s 
The rivalry took shape in the 2000s as both teams consistently competed for the AL Central title.  The Twins won three consecutive division titles from 2002–2004, with the Sox coming in second place each year.  The  season proved to be the closest, as Minnesota would win the division by four games after trainling Chicago by  games at the All-Star Break.  From September 16–18, 2003, Minnesota completed a pivotal three-game sweep of Chicago, holding the White Sox to a combined seven runs and extending its division lead from a half-game to  games.

The 2006 season was noted for White Sox manager Ozzie Guillen referring to the Twins players as "little piranhas".

In , The White Sox led the AL Central for most of the season. The Twins spent much of the season in second place behind the White Sox. In the penultimate series of the season from September 23–25, the Twins swept the White Sox to take a half-game lead. Both the Twins and White Sox lost two of three in their final series, forcing Chicago to play a make-up against the Detroit Tigers, which had been rained out earlier in September. The White Sox won this game, leaving the Sox and Twins tied atop the AL Central at 88–74, forcing a tie-breaker game to decide the division champion.

Chicago won the coin toss for home field advantage for the tiebreaker based on the rules at the time; White Sox fans were encouraged to wear black, leading to this game being called the "Blackout Game." The White Sox won the game, 1–0, on the strength of a Jim Thome home run in the 7th inning.  Chicago starting pitcher John Danks, pitching on three days rest, pitched eight shutout innings and closer Bobby Jenks pitched the 9th to earn the save.

2010s
The  season saw the Twins come back from down  games behind the White Sox in mid-July to win the division by 6 games; The Twins won 10 of 12 head-to-head meetings over the White Sox late in the season.

On May 3, 2011, Twins pitcher Francisco Liriano threw a no-hitter in a 1–0 win over the White Sox, the only no-hitter in the series between the two teams.  The next season, Liriano was traded to the White Sox in exchange for Eduardo Escobar and Pedro Hernández. As Liriano struggled with the command of his pitches, the White Sox removed him from the rotation in September.

The rivalry cooled off throughout the 2010s as neither team found consistent success.

2020s
The Twins won the AL Central in the COVID-19-shortened  season with a record of 36–24, finishing just one game ahead of the White Sox and the Cleveland Indians.  Both the Twins and White Sox made it to the postseason, marking the first time both teams would qualify. However, both lost their respective Wild Card Series.

On May 17, 2021, The White Sox were already comfortably ahead the Twins 15–4 in the top of the ninth inning. The Twins position player Willians Astudillo pitching. On a 3–0 count, White Sox catcher Yermín Mercedes hit a home run off of Astudillo to increase the score to 16–4. This was criticized by his own manager Tony La Russa for violating the unwritten rules of baseball. The rule said: "do not swing on a 3–0 count when your team is comfortably ahead." The next day, Twins pitcher Tyler Duffey threw behind Mercedes, possibly in an attempt to hit him. The umpires discussed and then threw Duffey out of the game believing it was intentional. Duffey was also suspended for two games. The White Sox ended up winning the AL Central division finishing with a record of 93–69, while the Twins finished in last with a 73–89 record.

Connections between the two teams

Players to play for both teams
The following notable players played for both the Twins and White Sox during their careers.

{| class="wikitable sortable"
|-
! Pos !! Player !! Twins tenure !! White Sox tenure
|-
| P || James Baldwin || 2003 || 1995–2001
|-
| C || Earl Battey || 1961–1967 || 1955–1959
|-
| P || Steve Carlton || 1987–1988 || 1986
|-
| P || Jesse Crain || 2004–2010 || 2011–2013
|-
| 3B || Joe Crede || 2009 || 2000–2008
|-
| P || Liam Hendriks || 2011–2013 || 2021–present
|-
| P || Jim Kaat || 1961–1973 || 1973–1975
|-
| OF || Pat Kelly || 1967–1968 || 1971–1976
|-
| OF || Jim Lemon || 1961–1963 || 1963
|-
| P || Francisco Liriano || 2005–2012 || 2012
|-
| P || Lance Lynn || 2018 || 2021–present
|-
| 1B || Justin Morneau || 2003–2013 || 2016
|-
| C || A. J. Pierzynski || 1998–2003 || 2005–2012
|-
| P || Ervin Santana || 2015–2018 || 2019
|-
| SS || Roy Smalley III || 1976–1982 || 1984
|-
| 1B || Jim Thome || 2010–2011 || 2006–2009
|}

See also 
Major League Baseball rivalries
Bears–Vikings rivalry
Blackhawks-Wild rivalry

References

Annual events in Major League Baseball
Chicago White Sox
Minnesota Twins
Major League Baseball rivalries
1961 establishments in Minnesota
1961 establishments in Illinois